Perugu Ramakrishna (born 27 May 1960) is an Indian poet and writer. He has written 4 books of poetry and 2 books of short-stories. He is the recipient of Rabindranath Tagore Memorial Literary Honour from Motivational Strips, the world’s most active writers forum. He wrote a long poem in English named Flemingo.

Awards 
 Rabindranath Tagore Memorial Literary Honour 2022 from Motivational Strips, the world's most active writers forum
 UWA Outstanding intellectual of 21st Century Award, Chennai 
 Ranjani-Kundurthi National Award
 Hyderabad and Millenium X-Ray National Award, Vijayawada.

References

External links 
 Poet information
 Award information

1960 births
Telugu writers
Living people
Indian male poets
Indian male short story writers
Writers from Karnataka
People from Nellore